Neuquén is a city in Argentina.

Neuquén may also refer to:


Geography 
 Neuquén Province, a province of Argentina
 Neuquén River, a river in the Neuquén Province
 Neuquén Governate, a former territorial division of Argentina between 1884 and 1955

Geology 
 Neuquén Basin, a hydrocarbon-rich sedimentary basin in northern Patagonia
 Neuquén Group, a Late Cretaceous geologic group in the Neuquén Basin
 Río Neuquén Subgroup, a subgroup of the geologic group, named after the river

Paleontology 
 Neuquenraptor, a theropod dinosaur from the Neuquén Basin
 Neuquensaurus, a sauropod dinosaur from the Neuquén Basin
 Neuquensuchus, a crocodyliform from the Neuquén Basin

Society 
 Neuquén – Plottier – Cipolletti, agglomeration of the cities of Neuquén, Plottier and Cipolletti
 Neuquén-Cipolletti bridges, a series of bridges over the Neuquén River
 Neuquén People's Movement, a provincial political party in Neuquén Province